Forfeit is a 2007 American mystery thriller film directed by Andrew Shea, starring Billy Burke, Sherry Stringfield, John Aylward and Gregory Itzin.

Cast
 Billy Burke as Frank O'Neal
 Sherry Stringfield as Karen
 John Aylward
 Gregory Itzin
 Phil Reeves
 Kirk Baltz as Phil
 Robert Rusler as Jimmy
 Lee Garlington
 Chris McKenna
 Steven Williams
 Wayne Knight as Bob

Plot

Frank O’Neal did something terrible when he was young, but he seems to be a changed man. He’s back in the old neighborhood after eighteen years, has a steady job as a security guard for an armored car company and he wants the love of his life to give him a second chance. She suffered more than anyone from what Frank did, but she’s never gotten over him and maybe she still has a shot at happiness. She’d have second thoughts if she knew about his obsession with his roommate’s height, that he spends every waking moment yelling at one particular television preacher and that he’s planning to rob the armored car company of every penny in its vault.

Reception

Forfeit  premiered at the SXSW Film Festival and went on to screen at numerous other festivals including the Brooklyn International Film Festival, the Palm Beach International Film Festival, the Breckenridge Festival of Film, the Sedona International Film Festival, the Flint Film Festival, Filmfest Hamburg (international premiere), the Edmonton International Film Festival, Starz Denver Film Festival, the Northampton Independent Film Festival, and the Santa Fe Film Festival.

Jeremy Martin of the The Austin Chronicle wrote that "With its plot twists – some of which are pretty smart – plus its religious commentary, creative editing, and casting of Newman from Seinfeld, it's worth more than most films in the mystery-crime genre."  LA Weekly wrote that while Burke "manages to make his character’s confusion weirdly resonant", Shea "can’t seem to decide if he’s making a thriller, a boozy blue-collar melodrama or a religious parable", and the film "ends up as a muddled mix of all three".

Justin Chang of Variety praised Burke's performance, calling it "decently sustained", and  wrote that while the film "doesn’t overstay its welcome", it is an "overworked revenge thriller that’s all setup and little payoff". Lawrence Wang of Film Threat wrote that "just past the half-way point of the movie, the pacing of the movie begins to really pick-up as the scenes are directed with more confidence and style and I found myself getting really engaged"... but that the film "suffered from an overqualified cast and an unfocused script and director." Popsyndicate.com gave the film four stars and concluded that "As a modern morality tale wrapped in the noir, Forfeit delivers. For the USA Festival, it is a highlight film."

References

External links

 Official website

 
 

American mystery drama films
2000s mystery drama films